2CBFly-NBOMe (NBOMe-2C-B-FLY, Cimbi-31) is a compound indirectly derived from the phenethylamine hallucinogen 2C-B, and related to benzodifurans like 2C-B-FLY and N-benzylphenethylamines like 25I-NBOMe. It was discovered in 2002, and further researched by Ralf Heim at the Free University of Berlin, and subsequently investigated in more detail by a team at Purdue University led by David E. Nichols. It acts as a potent partial agonist for the 5HT2A serotonin receptor subtype.

Analogues and derivatives

Legality

United Kingdom

United States
2CBFly-NBOMe is a controlled substance in Vermont as of January 2016.

References 

25-NB (psychedelics)
Bromoarenes
Phenethylamines
Psychedelic phenethylamines
Serotonin receptor agonists
Heterocyclic compounds with 3 rings
Oxygen heterocycles
Secondary amines
Methoxy compounds